Coveney Lake is a lake in Berrien County, in the U.S. state of Michigan.

Coveney Lake has the name Joseph Coveney, an Irish immigrant who settled there in the 1830s.

References

Lakes of Berrien County, Michigan